"Just the Way You Like It" is a song performed by American contemporary R&B singer Tasha Holiday, issued as the lead single from her debut album of the same name. The song features a rap from American hip hop musician Mase; and it was Holiday's only song to chart on the Billboard Hot 100, peaking at #93 in 1997.

The song contains samples of "School Boy Crush" by Average White Band and "The Breaks" by Kurtis Blow.

Music video

The official music video for the song was directed by Lara M. Schwartz.

Chart positions

References

External links
 
 

1996 songs
Tasha Holiday songs
Mase songs
1997 debut singles
MCA Records singles
Music videos directed by Lara M. Schwartz
Song recordings produced by Stevie J
Song recordings produced by Kelly Price
Songs written by Stevie J
Songs written by Kelly Price